Sidiki Bakaba (born in Abengourou, 1949) is an actor, scenario writer and director from Côte d'Ivoire.

He lives and works in Abidjan. After studying at the National School of Drama of Abidjan, he conducted training at the Living Theatre and with Grotowski.

In 2000, he became the director of the Palace of Culture of Abidjan (Palais de la Culture d'Abidjan) located at Treichville. He also founded the Actor's Studio (an actor training school in the Palace of Culture)

Along with a significant acting career, he produced fiction films, documentaries such as Les Guérisseurs (1988) which won the award for best music at the Francophone Film Festival, as well as the Voice of Hope at FESPACO Ouagadougou in 1989. He directed short films such as Le Nord est tombé sur la tête (1985–1998) for TV5, Le Parole (1992), L'Anniversaire de Daymios (November 1992) and documentaries such as Cinq siècles de solitude and La victoire aux mains nues in 2002.

A close supporter of ex-president Laurent Gbagbo, Bakaba April 2011 he was in Gbagbo's residence in Abidjan during the siege which resulted in Gbagbo's capture and is reported to have been wounded during it.

Education and training 
 1962–1966 in National School of Drama, in Abidjan. His focus was: stage production and actor management
 1966–1970 in National Institute for the Arts, in Abidjan
 1970–1972 in International University of Theatre, Paris. His focus was: Living Theatre, Grotowski

Teaching career 

 1970 1972  Teacher/intern at the National Institute of Arts, Abidjan
 1972 – 1975 Teacher of body language at the National Institute of Arts, Abidjan
 1985 Teacher of Drama, the Lavilliers Bernard School, Paris
 1985 – 1986 Teacher of Drama, School of Arts and Josephine Baker, Paris
 1990 Body language/expression training, Paris I, Panthéon Sorbonne University
 1991 Body language/expression training, Image d'Ailleurs Paris
 01-02.1992 Training as an actor, staging a play at the Franco-Nigerian Cultural Centre, Niamey
 Sept. 1992 GTRO Actor training, Abidjan
 2001–2008  Director of the Actors Studio at the Palace of Culture in Abidjan

Awards
{| class="wikitable sortable"
|+ List of awards
|-
! Year
! Film
! Awarded for
! Organization
|-
| 1979
|  sortname|Bako, l'autre rive|  Best Actor 
|  Festival de la Francophonie, Nice
|-
| 1985
| sortname|Petanqui,|Le Médecin de Gafire,|Suicides
| Grand prix d'interprétation
|Festival International of Carthage
|-
| 1987
|  sortname|Le Médecin de Gafire
|  Best Actor 
| Culture Festival in Algiers
|-
| 1988
|  sortname|Healers
|  Best Film Music Award
|  Festival de la Francophonie, Martinique
|-
| 1989
|  sortname|Les Guérisseurs
|  Voice of Hope Award  
|  FESPACO
|-
| 1992
|  
|  Honorary citizen of Louisville, Kentucky, USA
| 
|-
| 1997
|  sortname|Roues libres
|  Best Screenplay Award for  Ayala Bakaba and Sidiki Bakaba
| Amiens International Film Festival
|-
| 1999
|  sortname|Les Déconnards
| UNESCO Award
|  MASA Festival in Abidjan
|-
| 2001
|  sortname|Los Palenqueros,|Cinq Siècles de Solitude
|  UEMOA Award
|  
|-
| 2003
|  
|  Prix Culturel Africain du Mérite 
|  Rifad (International Network of African Women and the Diaspora)
|-
| 2005
|  
|  Ikeda Culture and Education Award 
|  SGI-Côte d'Ivoire 
|-
| 2005
|  sortname|Roues Libres
|  Best director   
|  l’Association des Professionnels du cinéma de Côte d'Ivoire
|-
| 2006
|  
|  Best Cultural Promoter 
|  Cultural Union of Journalists of Côte d'Ivoire
|-
| 2006
|  
|  Prix d’Excellence Diplôme d’Honneur  
|  General Council of Abengourou, his hometown
|-
| 2008
|  
|  Best Actor for West Africa 
|  la Fondation des artistes de Côte d'Ivoire (FONDACI)
|-
| 2009
|  
|  Awarded for his entire career
|  2nd Pan-African Cultural Festival in Algiers
|}

 Filmography 

Films
 1977	 Bako, l'autre rive , directed by: Jacques Champreux, starring:  Sidiki Bakaba, Cheik Doukouré and Doura Mané, won the "Prize of the Ecumenical Jury – Special Mention – Jacques Champreux" in 1978 Locarno International Film Festival and "Prix Jean Vigo – Jacques Champreux" in 1978 
 1978 The Savage State,  directed by: Francis Girod, starring:  Michel Piccoli, Marie-Christine Barrault and Claude Brasseur, won the "Best Sound Award – William Robert Sivel" and nominated for the "Best Editing Award – Geneviève Winding" in 1979 César Awards, France   
 1979	 L'Appât du gain,  directed by: Jules Takam, starring: Gérard Essomba, Howard Vernon and André Daguenet 
 1981	Le Professionnel,  directed by: Georges Lautner, starring: Jean-Paul Belmondo, Jean Desailly, Robert Hossein, won "Best Music Written for a Film – Ennio Morricone" in 1982 Cèsar Awards 
 1982	Le médecin de Gafire,  directed by: Mustapha Diop, starring: Sidiki Bakaba, Merlin N'Diagne and Fifi-Dalla Kouyate 
 1983 Suicides,  directed by: Jean-Claude Tchuilen, starring: Sidiki Bakaba, Christian Bebebey and Pierre Didy Tchakounte 
 1983	Petanqui,  directed by: Kozoloa Yeo, starring: Sidiki Bakaba and Douta Seck 
 1986   Descente aux enfers , directed by: Francis Girod, starring: Claude Brasseur, Sophie Marceau and Betsy Blair 
 1986	Desebagato, directed by: Emmanuel Sanon-Doba, starring: Sidiki Bakaba and Miriam Yago, produced by: Instituto Cubano del Arte e Industrias Cinematográficos (ICAIC), Marie Dubois is nominated as the Best Supporting Actress in 1987 César Awards, France
 1986	Descente aux enfers,  directed by: Francis Girod, starring:  Michel Piccoli, Marie-Christine Barrault and Claude Brasseur 
 1987	Campo Thiaroye, directed by: Ousmane Sembene, Thierno Faty Sow, starring:  Sidiki Bakaba, Hamed Camara and Philippe Chamelat, in 1988 won the "Children and Cinema Award", "Grand Special Jury Prize", "New Cinema Award", "Sergio Trasatti Award – Special Mention", "Special Golden Ciak" and "UNICEF Award" in 1988 Venice Film Festival''' 
 1987   Visages de femmes, directed by: Désiré Ecaré, starring:  Sidiki Bakaba, Kouadou Brou and Albertine N'Guessan, won the FIPRESCI Prize – Désiré Ecaré in 1985 Cannes Film Festival 
1988  Les guérisseurs, directed by:  Sidiki Bakaba, starring:  Georges Benson, Pierre-Loup Rajot and Nayanka Bell, produced by: Afriki Projection, Ministère de la Culture (participation)
 1990	Mamy Wata, directed by: Moustapha Diop, starring:  Philippe Ambrosini, Sidiki Bakaba, Gérard Essomba, Fifi-Dalla Kouyate, Sotigui Kouyaté,Sandra Novik, Umban U'kset, France Zobda 
 1998  Mes quatre dernières volontés, directed by: Angelo Cianci, starring: Carole Martinez, Sidiki Bakaba and Pierre Porquet, duration: 5 min, nominated for the "Best European Short Film/Angelo Cianci" in 1999 Brussels International Film Festival
 2000	Daressalam, directed by:  Issa Coello, starring: Haikal Zakaria, Abdoulaye Ahmat and Gérard Essomba 
 2002 Roues libres, directed by: Sidiki Bakaba, starring: Sidiki Bakaba, Adama Dahico, Placide Bayoro and Daouda Traoré
 2010	 Héritage Perdu, directed by: Christian Lara, starring: Sidiki Bakaba, Philippe Mory and Luc Saint-Eloy 

TV films
 1981  Un dessert pour Constance, by: Sarah Maldoror, starring:  Sidiki Bakaba, Cheik Doukouré and Elias Sherif 
 1982  En votre aimable règlement, by: Jean-Claude Charnay, starring:  Christian Parisy, Micky Sébastian and Anne Fontaine 
 1983	 L'Aventure ambiguë, directed by: Jacques Champreux for TF1
 1985  Néo Polar, TV series,  starring: Vincent Lindon, Jean-Pierre Léaud and Claude Nougaro 
 1985  L'épi d'or, TV series, directed by: Fabrice Cazeneuve, starring: Jean-Noël Brouté, Sophie Caffarel and Christine Murillo 
 1986 La méthode rose,  directed by: Claude de Givray, starring: Jean-Pierre Cassel, Marie-Noëlle Eusèbe and Gérard Caillaud, TF1 Films Production 
 1986 Azizah, la fille du fleuve,  directed by: Patrick Jamain, starring: Michel Auclair, Sidiki Bakaba and Kouadou Brou, produced by: Antenne 
 1989  Le triplé gagnant , TV series, starring: Raymond Pellegrin, Thierry Rode and Jean-Michel Martial 
 1992	 La Parle, directed by: Sidiki Bakaba
 1992	 L'Anniversaire de Daymio, Afriki Projection production
 1992	 Zoo Story, directed by: Edward Albee, Afriki Projection production
 1992	Maître Harold, directed by: Athol Furgarth, Afriki Projection production
 1995 – 1996	 L'Empereur Jones, directed by:Eugene O'Neill
 1995 – 1998	Le Nord est tombé sur la tête 1999	Les Déconnards, directed by Koffi Kwahulé
 2002	C’est ça là même, directed by Sidiki Bakaba
 2002	Papa Bon Dieu, directed by: Louis Sapin
 2002	 L’homme sur le parapet du pont, directed by: Guy Foissy
 2002	 Fiers Ivoiriens 2003	 l’Exil d’Albouri, directed by: Cheick Aliou N’dao
 2004	Monoko-Zohi, Diegou Bailly, Director: Sidiki Bakada
 2006	Il nous faut l’Amérique, directed by: Koffi Kwahule
 2007	Îles de Tempête, directed by: Bernard B. Dadié
 2008	 Hêrêmankono, directed by: Diégou Bailly
 2010	La Malice des hommes, directed by: Jean-Pierre Guingane

Documentaries
 1999	Fête de génération d'Abobote, director: Sidiki Bakaba, duration: 26’
 2000	Los Palenqueros Cimarrons de Colombie 2000  Cinq siècles de solitude, directors: Sidiki Bakaba et Blaise Ndjehoya, duration: 52’, producer: Afriki Projection and Absynthe Production, diffusion: CFI, TV5 Afrique, Awards: Prix de l’UMOA au Fespaco 2001 Amiens 2000, Média Nord-Sud 2001, Pan African Film Festival 2001, Images d’ailleurs 2001 
 2002	Côte d'Ivoire, terre d'espérance, a documentary about Afro-Colombia by Blaise N'Dehoya and Sidiki Bakaba 
 2002	 Caravane de la paix 2005	 La Victoire aux mains nuesFilmed theater
 1992	Zoo Story of Edward Albee, director: Abdul Karim, Afriki Projection production
 1992 	 Maitre Harold by Athol Furgarth, producer TV 1, production, Afriki Projection production
 1995 – 1996 L' Emperor Jones by Eugene O'Neill
 1999	The Déconnards by Koffi Kwahulé
 2002	Papa Bon Dieu, director: Sidiki Bakaba
 2003	L’Exil d’Albour, director: Sidiki Bakada
 2004	Monoko-Zohi, director: Sidiki Bakada
 2007	 Îles de Tempête, director: Sidiki Bakada
 2008	Hèrèmankono, director: Sidiki Bakaba
 2010	La Malice des Hommes'', director: Sidiki Bakaba

See also
 List of Ivorian films
 Cinema of Africa
 List of directors and producers of documentaries

References

External links 
 An interview with Sidiki Bakaba on infoabidjan.net
 Book entitled Focus on African films by Françoise Pfaff
 An interview with Sidiki Bakaba on ivoirediaspo.net
 
 
 
 Sidiki Bakaba Filmography on Fandango
 Official Site of Palace of Culture of Abidjan
 Biography and Filmography of Sidiki Bakaba on MTV
 In pictures: Fespaco Film Festival, in BBC News, Tuesday, 3 March 2009
 Sidiki Bakaba on the official site of Culture Palace of Abidjan

1949 births
Living people
20th-century Ivorian male actors
Ivorian film directors
People from Abengourou
People from Abidjan
21st-century Ivorian male actors